Kurampala  is a village in Pandalam in the state of Kerala, India.

Demographics
Kurampala is in the suburbs of Pandalam town in Kerala.  India census, Kurampala had a population of 20,098 with 9,591 males and 10,507 females.

References

Villages in Pathanamthitta district